A fireman's pole (also called a firefighter's pole, sliding pole or fire pole) is a pole that firefighters slide down to quickly reach the ground floor of a fire station. This allows them to respond to an emergency call faster, as they arrive at the fire engine faster than by using a standard staircase.

In the 1870s, answering an alarm, Chicago fireman George Reid decided to use the long-pole the company employed to lift horse's hay from the upper-loft to slide to the ground floor, arriving well ahead of the rest of the company.  Company Captain David Kenyon of Engine Company 21 then successfully petitioned the department be allowed to install a pole through the floor of the loft sleeping space to create what became the standard set-up.

Overview 

The firefighter's pole is found in multi-level fire stations, if the firefighters' living quarters are located upstairs. When they are dispatched to an emergency, the firefighters descend to the ground floor, put on their firefighting gear, and board the fire engine as quickly as possible. The pole may run through a hole in the floor, or it may be accessed from a balcony. To use a pole, a firefighter grasps it with their hands, then clamps their legs around it, and then replaces their tight hand grip with a looser hand or arm grip to allow themselves to descend, using their legs to control the speed. This is somewhat similar to the technique used for fast-roping.

History 

Until 1878, spiral staircases or sliding chutes were common, but not particularly fast. Fire houses were also equipped with spiral staircases so horses would not try to climb the stairs into the living quarters.

Captain David B. Kenyon of Chicago's all-black Engine Company No. 21 worked in a three-story fire station. The ground floor contained the firefighting equipment, the floor above was for recreation and sleeping, and the top floor was the hayloft to store the winter supply of hay for the fire engines' horses. During transport, the hay was secured to a wagon using a wooden binding pole, which was stored in the hayloft when not in use. Firefighter George Reid slid down the pole to respond to a call for help once, which inspired Kenyon to create a permanent pole.In 1878 Kenyon convinced his chief to make the necessary hole in the building and install the pole, after agreeing to pay for any necessary maintenance. The company crafted a pole out of a Georgia pine beam by shaving and sanding it into a  diameter pole which they gave several coats of varnish and a coat of paraffin.

Despite being the butt of many jokes, others soon realized Company 21 was usually the first company to arrive when called, especially at night, and the chief of the department ordered the poles to be installed in all Chicago fire stations. In 1880 the first brass pole was installed in the Worcester Fire Department.

Safety issues 

Losing one's grip on the pole can result in falling from a great height; the firefighter may hit an object such as a door extending from a truck; poor speed control can result in injured or even broken legs upon impact with the floor; and burns can occur due to friction if the skin rubs against the pole. If the pole runs through an unprotected hole in the floor, there is a risk of a person falling through it, as well as exhaust fumes rising into the living quarters.

For these reasons, fire stations built since the 1970s are often built with the living quarters downstairs, and some older fire stations have had their poles removed. In the United States, the National Fire Protection Association has called for the removal of all poles from US fire stations due to safety hazards. The fire service in New Zealand has already removed most of them. In the United Kingdom, more modern fire stations are built with one storey negating the need for a pole and they are sometimes removed from old stations that no longer require the upper floors for operational purposes.

However, due to the strong tradition, time advantages and new safety features, poles are common worldwide even in newly built stations. Slide poles can be made safer. Cushions can be placed around the base of the pole to soften landings. Exhaust control systems can stop fumes from rising upstairs. To prevent accidental falls, the pole can be guarded by railings, baskets, a door or a weight-activated trapdoor that opens only when weight is applied to the pole.

References 

Firefighting equipment
American inventions